Panthera tigris tigris, sometimes referred to as the mainland Asian tiger, is the native tiger subspecies of mainland Asia comprising the following tiger populations:
 Bengal tiger — occurs in the Indian Subcontinent from India, Nepal and Bhutan to Bangladesh.
 Siberian tiger — inhabits Northeast Asia, from eastern Siberia to Northeast China, and possibly North Korea
 South China tiger — occurs in southern China
 Indochinese tiger — inhabits forests in Indochina, save for the Malayan Peninsula
 Malayan tiger — inhabits Peninsular Malaysia
The Caspian tiger  inhabited Western and Central Asia

A whole-genome sequencing analysis of 32 tiger specimens supported six monophyletic tiger clades and indicated that the most recent common ancestor lived about 110,000 years ago.

See also 
 Bornean tiger
 Panthera tigris sondaica

References 

Tiger subspecies